Halianthella is a genus of sea anemones in the family Halcampidae.

Species
Species in the genus include:
 Halianthella annularis Carlgren, 1938
 Halianthella kerguelensis (Studer, 1879)

References

Halcampidae
Hexacorallia genera